This is a comprehensive list of awards, honours and other recognitions bestowed on Muammar Gaddafi.

Honours

National honours

Foreign honours

Honorary degrees
: University of Khartoum Honorary doctorate, 1996 (revoked on 7 March 2011).
: Myongji University Honorary doctorate, 29 March 2000.
: University of Algiers Honorary doctorate, 27 March 2005.
: Megatrend University Honorary doctorate, March 2007.
: Carthage University-National Institute of Applied Science and Technology Honorary doctorate in Arabic and Islamic Civilisation, 12 October 2008.
: Belarusian State University of Informatics and Radioelectronics Honorary doctorate, 2010.

Eponyms

Gaddafi National Mosque, the biggest mosque in Kampala, Uganda.
Gaddafi Mosque, in Dodoma, Tanzania.
Gaddafi Mosque, in Freetown, Sierra Leone.
Gaddafi Mosque, in Kigali, Rwanda.
Gadaffi Barracks, an Ugandan Army military base in Jinja, Uganda.
Gaddafi Stadium, the fourth largest cricket stadium in Pakistan, situated in Lahore. The complex also has a mosque and a bus station named after Gaddafi.
Gadaffi Hockey Stadium, the biggest field hockey stadium in the world, located in Lahore, Pakistan.
Gaddafi Soccer Stadium, a soccer stadium in Lahore, Pakistan.
Gaddafi International Foundation for Charity Associations, an international NGO.
Gaddafi Gardens, a garden in Paola, Malta (renamed Mediterranean Garden in 2016)

Other honours
In December 2007, Gaddafi was awarded the Golden Key to the City of Madrid by then-Mayor Alberto Ruiz-Gallardón.
In August 2008, Gaddafi was invested by an assembly of African monarchs and chieftains with the title "King of Kings" of Africa.

References

Gaddafi, Muammar
Muammar Gaddafi